Faba may refer to:
 Vicia faba, a species of bean
 Faba Mill., a synonym of Vicia L.
 3-hydroxyoctanoyl-(acyl-carrier-protein) dehydratase, an enzyme